The following list includes all the men's Association football clubs of Cyprus who are participating or have participated in the national championships of the country. A total of 197 clubs have played in the national championships of Cyprus from their inception in 1934 until the 2019–20 season.

The national championships of Cyprus are the Cypriot First Division, the Cypriot Second Division, the Cypriot Third Division and the Cypriot Fourth Division which has been dissolved after 2014–15 season. The championships are run and organized by the Cyprus Football Association (CFA). Since 2015, National Championship is also the STOK Elite Division which is run and organized by the Confederation of local federations of Cyprus (STOK).

The following table is a list of Cypriot football clubs. For a complete list see :Category:Football clubs in Cyprus.

Clubs

Legend:

 Name: The clubs are listed under their present name. In some cases, some teams used a different name in previous years while they were participating in the national championships.
 Location: The location where the club resides. The location of the refugee clubs is indicated as it was before the Turkish invasion of Cyprus.
 District: Cyprus is divided in six districts. The location of each club belongs to one of these six districts.
 Founded-Dissolved: The period of existence of the club (founding date and dissolution date). The word "unknown" is indicated for the clubs which there is no any data about their existence. For clubs that are still exist is no dissolution date is indicated.
 2019–20 season: The league in which the club is participating in the 2019–20 season.
 Highest level: The highest level of the Cypriot football league system in which the club has ever participated.

Notes:

1The refugee clubs location (clubs which before 1974 were located in the areas that are occupied by the Turkish army after the Turkish invasion of Cyprus) is indicated as it was before 1974.

2The Turkish Cypriot teams withdrew from Cypriot football in 1955.

See also 
 Football in Cyprus
 Cypriot First Division
 Cypriot Second Division
 Cypriot Third Division
 Cypriot Fourth Division
 Cypriot Cup

References

Sources
Cyprus - Participations per club at Cypriot First Division
Cyprus - Participations per club at Cypriot Second Division
Cyprus - Participations per club at Cypriot Third Division
Cyprus - Participations per club at Cypriot Fourth Division

Bibliography

External links 
Cyprus Football Association

 
Clubs
Cyprus
Football clubs